Halocoryza acapulcana is a species of brown coloured ground beetle in the subfamily Scaritinae which can be found in Ecuador and Mexico.

References

Beetles described in 1966
Scaritinae